Aloe karasbergensis, is a species of Aloe found in Namibia to the Northwest Cape Province, South Africa.

Subspecies
 Aloe karasbergensis subsp. karasbergensis
 Aloe karasbergensis subsp. hunsbergensis

References

External links
 
 

karasbergensis